is a Prefectural Natural Park in Kanagawa Prefecture, Japan. Established in 1983, it derives its name from Mount Jinba and Lake Sagami. The park lies wholly within the municipality of Sagamihara.

See also
 National Parks of Japan

References

Parks and gardens in Kanagawa Prefecture
Protected areas established in 1983
1983 establishments in Japan
Sagamihara